List of High Commissioners of the Faroe Islands.

The Danish title is Rigsombudsmand. The High Commissioner has a seat in the Faroese Løgting (parliament); is allowed to speak but not allowed to vote. The High Commissioner represents the Danish government in the Faroese Løgting.

References 

List 
High Commissioners of the Faroe Islands
High